The Jaffa Shrine Center is a 3,200-seat multipurpose arena located in downtown Altoona, Pennsylvania.  The current Shrine Center, headquarters to the Jaffa Shriners, was built in 1930, opening on September 25 of that year.  It was the largest convention center in Blair County until the Blair County Convention Center was built.

Inside, the Shrine Center auditorium, located on the main level, can be used for boxing, wrestling, basketball, concerts, banquets, the circus, conventions, such as Sci-Fi Valley Con,  and other events. It seats up to 4,000 for concerts, boxing and wrestling. The auditorium features an 80-by-30-foot permanent stage and four offstage dressing and locker rooms. A mezzanine leads into the auditorium and features restrooms, checkrooms and two permanent concession stands, among other facilities.

There are two lounges, located on either side of the auditorium.  The 22nd Street Lounge measures  and can hold up to 100, and the 23rd Street Lounge, which measures , holds to 70.

At ground level is a  banquet room, which also hosts meetings and trade shows.  It also features a state-of-the-art kitchen.  A smaller meeting room (the Arabian Room) is also located at ground level.

External links
 

Indoor arenas in Pennsylvania
Convention centers in Pennsylvania
Sports venues in Pennsylvania
Buildings and structures in Altoona, Pennsylvania
Altoona, Pennsylvania
1930 establishments in Pennsylvania
Shriners